The 1921 San Jose State Spartans football team represented State Teachers College at San Jose during the 1921 college football season.

This was the first season of intercollegiate football for San Jose State since 1900.  The 1921 team was led by head coach David Wooster, and they played home games at Spartan Field in San Jose, California. The team finished the season with a record of one win and five losses (1–5). The Spartans were outscored by their opponents 35–141 for the season. In 1922, they became a charter member of the California Coast Conference (CCC).

Schedule

Notes

References

San Jose State
San Jose State Spartans football seasons
San Jose State Spartans football